Prince of Songkla University (PSU) is the first university in southern Thailand, established in 1967. The name of the university was granted by the King Bhumibol Adulyadej in honor of  Prince Mahidol Adulyadej, Prince of Songkla, the King's father.

The university consists of four campuses and one education service area. In 1968, the first permanent campus was established in Pattani. The campus in Hat Yai was opened in 1971 and is now the main campus, with more than 50% of the university's students. Other campuses were established in Phuket (1977) and Surat Thani (1990). Additionally, the Trang education service area was founded in 1991 and later developed to be a campus of PSU in 1999. As 2007, the university offers 295 educational programs to its 34,000 students, including 18 international programs and three foreign language programs.

Prince of Songkla University hosts hundreds of international students. The Phuket campus accommodates the most students from European and North American universities. The International Study Program in Phuket (ISPP) is multidisciplinary, offering courses in social sciences, history, intercultural communications, tourism, human resources, and international finance and economics.

History
In 1962 the Department of Provincial Administration was assigned by the Thai government, through the Southern Development Committee, to initiate a project to set up a university in southern Thailand in accordance with the Southern Development Plan. In 1965 the cabinet approved, in principle, that the main campus of the university was to be at Ruesamilae, an urban area of Pattani.

Since the Pattani site abuts the sea, very high humidity and sea water vapor would lead to prohibitive maintenance costs for the upkeep of the engineering laboratory equipment and engineering teaching facilities. It was agreed to relocate the Faculty of Engineering to a new site. After a long search, it was decided that the Faculty of Engineering should be located in Hat Yai District, Songkhla Province. Lady Atthakraweesunthorn agreed to donate a plot of land totaling 690 rai (approximately 276 acres) at Tambon Korhong, Hat Yai district, Songkla Province, which was to be used as a new campus of Prince of Songkla University where the Faculty of Engineering would be based.

In 1968 the National Assembly of Thailand passed the Prince of Songkla University Act, which became effective on 13 March of that year. Prince of Songkla University thus proclaimed 13 March as its “Foundation Day”. In 1969, the construction at Hat Yai campus was started. On 5 July 1971 when it was partially completed, about two hundred students and staff members of the Faculty of Engineering were moved to the new campus at Hat Yai.

Rankings

Prince of Songkla University is always ranked in the top 10 universities of Thailand. The university was 481st worldwide in 2006 and 525th in 2007 in THES - QS World University Rankings which was the 7th and 6th Thai universities on the list, respectively.

In the Webometrics Ranking of World Universities, the university performs as a successful cyber-university.  In Thailand, it has topped the list of Thai universities for five non-consecutive times in 2008, 2009, and 2011. Prince of Songkla University is the first Thai university to make top 400 (January 2008), top 300 (January 2009) and top 200 (July 2009) of the world rankings. In July 2009, the university was ranked 175th in the world, 18th in Asia and 2nd in the Southeast Asia behind the National University of Singapore.

National Research Universities
Prince of Songkla University a member of 9 universities of Thailand National Research Universities Project

Center of Excellence in Nanotechnology for Energy

The Center of Excellence in Nanotechnology for Energy (CENE) officially started in April 2012, when the former Excellence Center ended. The former Center (October 2006 – March 2012) comprised three groups of the faculties from Pharmacy, Science and Engineering which had been doing research in drug delivery, multilayers for MEMs and membranes for nanofiltration, and engineering nanomaterials, respectively. They have published more than 40 articles in various international journals plus 10 petty patents and patents.  For the present, CENE consists of two groups of faculties from Science and Engineering who both focus on the theme of "Micro- and Nanoscale Energy". This involves energy conversion, energy storage and energy saving.

The objectives and ultimate goals of CENE are:
1) to develop the  materials and systems for energy conversion without using external power supply and no combustible fuels. The production of electricity is aimed to feed ultra-low and low-power consumption electronics.
2) to develop the thermal energy storage derived from agricultural products and waste crops.  They are aimed to be environmental friendly from the starting process until the end of usage and recycling process.
3) to develop the nanomaterials for color and multifunctional films coated on window glasses for long-life using in buildings and cars.
By the objectives and goals described above, it is believed that CENE achievement would lead to "Clean Energy for Green City".

Faculties 
Hat Yai Campus
 Faculty of Agro-Industry 
 Faculty of Dentistry 
 Faculty of Economics 
 Faculty of Engineering
 Faculty of Environment Management 
 Faculty of Law
 Faculty of Liberal Arts 
 Faculty of Management Sciences
 Faculty of Medical Technology
 Faculty of Medicine 
 Faculty of Natural Resources 
 Faculty of Nursing
 Faculty of Pharmaceutical Sciences 
 Faculty of Sciences 
 Faculty of Traditional Thai Medicine
 Faculty of Veterinary Sciences
 Institute of Peace Studies 
 International College
 Graduate School
 Marine and Coastal Resources Institute
Pattani Campus 
 Faculty of Communication Sciences
 Faculty of Education
 Faculty of Fine and Applied Arts 
 Faculty of Humanities and Social Sciences 
 Faculty of Nursing
 Faculty of Political Sciences 
 Faculty of Sciences and Technology
 College of Islamic Studies 
Phuket Campus 
 Faculty of Hospitality and Tourism
 Faculty of International Studies 
 Faculty of Technology and Environment
 College of Computing
 Department of Computer Engineering
 Phuket Community College
 Interdisciplinary Graduate School of Earth System Science and Andaman Natural Disaster Management
 International College of Arts and Sciences, Phuket
Surat Thani Campus
 Faculty of Liberal Arts and Management Sciences 
 Faculty of Sciences and Industrial Technology
 Faculty of Innovative Agriculture and Fisheries
 International College
 Graduate School 
Trang Campus
 Faculty of Commerce and Management 
 Faculty of Architecture
 College of Innovation for Performing Arts and Management

References

External links
PSU's English website
rak-mor-or.com <in Thai>
Prince of Songkla University Admissions
Applications of Piezo and Pyroelectric Materials as Microsources of Energy Harvesting
Faculty of Science
Research And Development Office, Prince of Songkla University
CENE Official Site
uguidemag.com

Universities in Thailand
Buildings and structures in Songkhla province
Educational institutions established in 1967
1967 establishments in Thailand